Finnveden or Finnheden is one of the ancient small lands of Småland. It corresponded to the hundreds of Sunnerbo Hundred, Östbo Hundred and Västbo Hundred. Finnveden had its own judicial system and laws, as did the other small lands. Finnveden is situated around lake Bolmen and the river Lagan. Most runestones in Finnveden describe men who died in England. Finnveden is today divided and is a part of the counties of Halland, Kronoberg and Jönköping.
 
It was first mentioned by Jordanes when he referred to its population as the Finnaithae (derived from an old form of Finnheden, Finn(h)aith-) when describing the nations of Scandza in Getica.

Etymology
The Scandinavian placenames Finnveden, Finnmark and the province of Finland (which gave name to Finland) are all thought to be derived from finn, an ancient Germanic word for nomadic hunter-gatherers (cf. to find).

See also
 Fenni

References

 
Småland